Lumbriclymeninae is a subfamily of marine polychaete worms in the family Maldanidae.

Description
Rhodininae worms are characterized by a lack of cephalic and pygidial plates, a keel formed by the prostomium, short and curved nuchal groves, a variety of notochaetae forms, anterior neurochaetae shaped as acicular spines in the anterior chaetigers (i.e. segments with chaetae) and as rostrate uncini in posterior chaetigers, a long and conical pygidium with many transversal striae, and dark circular rings.

Classification
The subfamily contains 4 genera and 22 species.
Lumbriclymene  – 10 species
Lumbriclymenella  – 2 species
Clymenopsis  – 4 species
Praxillura  – 6 species

References

Polychaetes